Latvia participated in the X Summer Paralympic Games in Atlanta, United States.

See also
1996 Summer Paralympics
Latvia at the 1996 Summer Olympics

External links
International Paralympic Committee
Latvian Paralympic Committee

Nations at the 1996 Summer Paralympics
1996
Paralympics